The Delhi Sultanate literature began with the rise of Persian speaking people to the throne of the Sultanate of Delhi, naturally resulted in the spread of the Persian language in India. It was the official language and soon literary works in the language began to appear. Initially Persian literature talked about topics which were familiar to those from Persia. Gradually however as more Indians learnt the language, the literary works began to have a more Indian theme. Amir Khusrau was a noted writer of the period, who was one of the first writers to write Persian literature about events concerning India. His inspiration came from events he saw around, his work soon grew to be appreciated and he became a court poet.

Sanskrit continued to remain an important language of the time, and despite the increasing influence of Persian, it was able to hold its ground. Many preferred Sanskrit poets as they were more established and experienced than those that worked in the new languages. A centre for Sanskrit learning opened at Mithila (north Bihar). It preserved the tradition of classical Sanskrit literature and kept it alive. Sanskrit was however beginning to lose its popularity as an intellectual language, and the Brahmans struggled to find patrons to keep it alive.

There was also a significant amount of work taking place in regional languages. Both Sanskrit and Persian were languages which the average person did not understand. Various regional languages flourished and soon literary work in these languages began to take place.

References

Indian literature
Persian-language literature
Delhi Sultanate
Literature of the medieval Islamic world